Vesicle-associated membrane protein 8 is a protein that in humans is encoded by the VAMP8 gene.

Synaptobrevins/VAMPs, syntaxins, and the 25-kD synaptosomal-associated protein SNAP25 are the main components of a protein complex involved in the docking and/or fusion of synaptic vesicles with the presynaptic membrane. The protein encoded by this gene is a member of the vesicle-associated membrane protein (VAMP)/synaptobrevin family. It is associated with the perinuclear vesicular structures of the early endocytic compartment. It has been found that VAMP8 interacts specifically with the soluble NSF-attachment protein (alpha-SNAP), most likely through an VAMP8-containing SNARE complex. Phosphorylation of VAMP8 inside the conserved SNARE-domain can suppress vesicle fusion.

Interactions
Vesicle-associated membrane protein 8 has been shown to interact with STX4, SNAP23, STX1A, STX8 and STX7.

References

Further reading